Milan Joksimović (born 9 February 1990) is a Serbian football defender who plays for Novi Pazar.

Club career
In February 2018, he joined KA in Iceland.

References

External links
 
 Milan Joksimović Stats at utakmica.rs

1990 births
Sportspeople from Užice
Living people
Serbian footballers
Association football defenders
FK Sloboda Užice players
FK Inđija players
FK Spartak Subotica players
FK Jedinstvo Užice players
FK Metalac Gornji Milanovac players
FC Gorodeya players
Knattspyrnufélag Akureyrar players
FK Liepāja players
FK Novi Pazar players
Serbian First League players
Serbian SuperLiga players
Belarusian Premier League players
Úrvalsdeild karla (football) players
Latvian Higher League players
Serbian expatriate footballers
Expatriate footballers in Belarus
Expatriate footballers in Iceland
Expatriate footballers in Latvia
Serbian expatriate sportspeople in Belarus
Serbian expatriate sportspeople in Iceland
Serbian expatriate sportspeople in Latvia